Lendl is a surname. Notable people with the surname include:

Bernhard Lendl, Austrian chemist
Isabelle Lendl (born 1991), American golfer
Ivan Lendl (born 1960), Czech tennis player